Eskimo Hill [el. ]  is summit in North Slope Borough, Alaska, United States.

Eskimo Hill was named in 1924.

References

Mountains of North Slope Borough, Alaska
Mountains of Alaska